Aap Ke Aa Jane Se (English meaning-After Your Arrival) (international title: Age is Just a Number) is an Indian soap opera which aired on Zee TV from 15 January 2018 to 31 May 2019. Produced by Bodhi Tree Multimedia, it starred Suhasi Dhami and Karan Jotwani as Vedika and Sahil. The show marked the comeback of Dhami after a three-year break from television. It replaced Dil Dhoondta Hai  in its timeslot  and was replaced by Hamari Bahu Silk .

Seasons

Plot

Season 1

Set in Kanpur, 42-year-old Vedika Mathur is a simple and single mother, who faces many hardships due to being a middle class, single mother and lives with her mother Manjula and 15-year-old daughter Arya Mathur. Sahil Agarwal, a 24-year-old irresponsible young man, returns to his home after his studies. His elder aunt Bimla fixes his wedding to his friend, Nidhi but he declines and is thrown out by his aunt, Bimla.

Vedika, who is in need of money rents out a room in her home to Sahil under the impression that Sahil is married. Sahil doesn't tell her the truth because he knows that Vedika wouldn't allow him to stay. Despite trying to stay away from him in order to avoid humiliation from the community, Vedika and Sahil eventually fall in love, but Vedika refuses to accept it due to their age gap and social problems. Soon enough, she realizes her love and accepts Sahil.

Sahil proposes marriage to Vedika and she agrees but on their wedding day, Vedika switches places with Nidhi and almost marries her. He considers their marriage invalid as he does not love her and denies completing the wedding rituals. On the other hand, Nidhi is revealed to have married Sahil only for his wealth as she and her parents are on the verge of bankruptcy. Nidhi devises a plan to bring Sahil closer to her but fails multiple times but eventually reveals that she is pregnant with his child.

Nidhi is exposed in front of everyone and her baby is revealed to belong to Karan, Sahil's close friend. Nidhi almost successfully steals the Agarwal property but fails and is sent to jail. Sahil's younger sister, Shruti, was having an affair with her brother in law, Puneesh Tiwari, but later gets married to Karan. Nidhi tries to create differences between them when she returns, using her unborn baby as a pawn but Shruti foils her plans constantly.

Arya, meets Mohit, Nidhi's brother, whom she blindly falls in love with. Mohit takes Arya to a party where he spikes her drink and films a video of her to ruin her reputation and honour. Yash makes an entry and teams up with Vedika to clear Arya's name. After sometime, Yash develops feelings for Vedika and blackmails her to get married to him which she reluctantly agrees to. They move in to the Agarwal Mansion where Yash reveals that Bimla seduced Yash's father, who was 5 years younger than her so that she could be rich, despite Yash's father having a family. Yash vows to get revenge from Bimla as he blames her for his mother's death.

When Yash is diagnosed with cancer, he apologises to Vedika for ill treating her and asks her to give him a child. They both decide on IVF instead of Natural pregnancy but due to a nurse's mistake, Sahil becomes the donor for Yash and Vedika's child. Soon, Yash dies from an accident. Bhumi, Vedika's distant cousin comes to stay with Vedika.

Not wanting Sahil and Vedika to unite, Bimla poisons Sahil's mother, Anjana. When she finds out that Vedika is pregnant with Sahil's baby, Anjana happily goes to Vedika's house to propose marriage. Sahil hears of this from Bimla and he too goes to see Vedika. The poison stsrts taking effect on Anjana which causes to fall down the stairs as she feels dizzy. Sahil arrives at that moment and misunderstands Vedika to be the culprit and has her jailed. In prison, Sahil marries her cousin Bhumi, in a fit of rage. Vedika delivers a son while Bimla's daughter, Gauri delivers a daughter in same hospital. Bimla replaces Vedika's son with a stillborn child and flees. Meanwhile, Gauri's husband, Deepak exchanges that same stillborn baby with his daughter as he wanted a son.

Vedika leaves the city and Bimla lies to Sahil about Vedika abandoning the baby and handsover Vedika's son to Sahil who adopts and names the baby as Ved with Bhumi, unaware that the child is his.

5 years later

Vedika returns to Kanpur with her daughter, Sadika, where Sahil already lives with Bhumi and Ved. Arya returns to India after her studies. Vedika soon learns that Sadika is Gauri and Deepak's daughter, and Ved is her real son. Later Sahil also learns Ved is his son and Anjana was killed by Bimla. Enraged, he leaves her and Bhumi; reunites with Vedika after she falls pregnant with his child as Ved is in need of a bone marrow transplant from a full sibling. Sahil falls off a cliff and is declared dead, which Vedika refuses to believe. She meets Sahil's look-alike, Jackie who turns out to be his twin brother, who Bimla abandoned because she was jealous of Anjana who gave birth to twin boys whereas Bimla had two daughters. Arya, marries Puneesh to save her family but later divorces him and falls in love with Jackie's foster brother, Guddu and they get married.

Sahil returns but has lost his memory. He unintentionally marries  Pankti, the daughter of politician Tej Pratap Singh to save her from her father. Pankti's mother selfishly tries to separate Vedika and Sahil for Pankti, but Pankti disapproves of her means. She later places Pankti and Sahil in bed to cause a misunderstanding between Vedika and Sahil.

Vedika delivers another son, Virat, who she has donate his bone marrow to save their elder son, Ved. Sahil and Vedika find a partner for Pankti and she leaves with him. Bimla's long-lost son, Kshitij comes to destroy Agarwals and kills Guddu, framing Sahil. Arya marries Kshitij for revenge but realises that Sahil is innocent and that Kshitij is responsible for Guddu's death. Later, he kidnaps Ved and Virat to lure Sahil and Vedika. They manage to save both children with the help of Arya, but Kshitij shoots Sahil and Vedika. The two fall down a cliff and vow to reunite in their next lives to complete their love story.

20 years later

Vedika and Sahil are reborn. Reborn Vedika is a caring and kind-hearted divorcee. Reborn Sahil falls for her but is engaged to her sister Avantika. The two meet the now old Manjula, who reveals they're reborn. Sahil and Vedika marry. To separate them, Avantika teams up with Tanuj, Vedika's ex-husband. He kidnaps her who kills him. Avantika is exposed and arrested. Sahil and Vedika remarry and unite forever.

Cast

Main

 Suhasi Dhami as
 Vedika Gupta Agarwal – Manjula's daughter; Rohit's sister; Anurag and Yash's widow; Sahil's wife; Arya, Ved and Virat's mother; Sadika's foster mother. (2018–2019) (dead)
 Vedika Pratab Kashyap – Reborn Vedika; Prem and Prabha's daughter; Avantika's sister; Tanuj's former wife; Sahil's wife. (2019)
 Karan Jotwani as 
 Sahil Agarwal – Rishab and Anjana's son; Jackie and Shruti's brother; Bhumi and Pankti's former husband; Vedika's husband; Arya's foster father; Ved and Virat's father. (2018–2019) (dead)
 Jackie Agarwal – Rishab and Anjana's son; Omprakash and Usha's foster son; Sahil and Shruti's brother; Guddu and Mandakini's foster brother. (2018–2019)
 Sahil Kashyap – Reborn Sahil; Shashi and Rekha's son; Geet's brother; Avantika's former fiancé; Vedika's husband. (2019)

Recurring
 Hetal Gada as Arya Mathur Agarwal – Vedika and Anurag's daughter; Sahil's foster daughter; Ved and Virat's half-sister; Guddu's widow; Kshitij's wife. (2018–2019)
 Geeta Tyagi as Bimla Devi Agarwal (Badi Amma) – Ishwar's widow; Gauri, Prachi and Kshitij's mother; Sahil, Jackie and Shruti's aunt. (2018–2019)
 Aekam Binjwe as Ved Agarwal – Vedika and Sahil's elder son; Bhumi's foster son; Virat's brother; Arya's half-brother. (2018–2019)
 Unknown as Virat Agarwal – Vedika and Sahil's younger son; Ved's brother; Arya's half-brother (2019)
 Richa Bhattacharya as Manjula Gupta – Vedika and Rohit's mother; Arya, Ved and Virat's grandmother. (2018–2019)
 Barsha Chatterjee as Maya Srinivasan Awasti – Vedika's best friend; Raghav's wife. (2018–2019)
 Micckie Dudaaney as Tanuj Malhotra – Reborn Vedika's former husband. (2019) 
 Manisha Rawat as Avantika Pratab – Prem and Prabha's daughter; Reborn Vedika's sister; Reborn Sahil's former fiancée. (2019)
 Shaily Priya Pandey as Nidhi Tripathi (2018).
 Harish Chhabra as Prem Pratab – Chetna's brother; Prabha's husband; Avantika and reborn Vedika's father. (2019)
 Hetal Yadav as Prabha Somani Pratab – Prem's wife; Avantika and reborn Vedika's mother. (2019)
 Simran Gangwani as Chetna Pratab – Prem's sister. (2019)
 Yajuvendra Singh as Shashi Kashyap – Dheeraj's brother; Rekha's husband; Geet and reborn Sahil's father. (2019)
 Zahida Parveen as Rekha Singh Kashyap – Shashi's wife; Geet and reborn Sahil's mother. (2019)
 Sonali Jha as Geet Kashyap – Shashi and Rekha's daughter; Reborn Sahil's sister. (2019)
 Vishnu Sharma as Dheeraj Kashyap – Shashi's brother; Meena's husband. (2019)
 Leena Acharya as Meena Soni Kashyap – Dheeraj's wife. (2019)
 Mitali Pandey as Sakshi – Reborn Vedika's friend. (2019)
 Manish Goplani as Kshitij "Krish" Agarwal – Ishwar and Bimla's son; Gauri and Prachi's brother; Yash's half-brother; Arya's second husband. (2019)
 Alice Kaushik as Daisy - Jackie's girlfriend (2018)
 Ashish Dixit as Guddu Srivastava – Omprakash and Usha's son; Mandakini's brother; Jackie's foster brother; Arya's late husband. (2018–2019)
 Deepali Saini as Mandakini Srivastava – Omprakash and Usha's daughter; Guddu's sister; Jackie's foster sister. (2018–2019)
 Ekta Sharma as Usha Juneja Srivastava – Omprakash's wife; Guddu and Mandakini's mother; Jackie's foster mother. (2018–2019)
 Resha Konkar as Gauri Agarwal Mehta – Ishwar and Bimla's younger daughter; Prachi and Kshitij's sister; Yash's half-sister; Deepak and Manish's former wife; Sadika's mother. (2018–2019)
 Sailesh Gulabani as Deepak Ramnani – Gauri's former husband; Shruti's husband; Sadika's father. (2018–2019)
 Hannah Chaudhary as Sadika Ramnani – Gauri and Deepak's daughter; Vedika's foster daughter. (2018)
 Kshitija Saxena as Shruti Agarwal Ramnani – Rishab and Anjana's daughter; Sahil and Jackie's sister; Karan's former wife; Deepak's wife. (2018–2019)
 Nidhi Mathur as Prachi Agarwal Tiwari – Ishwar and Bimla's elder daughter; Gauri and Kshitij's sister; Yash's half-sister; Puneesh's wife. (2018–2019)
 Karan Mehat as Puneesh Tiwari – Tushar's uncle; Prachi's husband. (2018–2019)
 Jannat Zubair Rahmani as Pankti Singh – Tej Pratap and Sadhna's daughter; Sahil's former wife. (2019)
 Amit Behl as Politician Tej Pratap Singh – Sadhna's husband; Pankti's father. (2019)
 Neetu Pandey as Sadhna Singh – Tej Pratap's wife; Pankti's mother. (2019)
 Amit Bhanushali as Karan Verma – Sahil's best friend; Shruti's former husband. (2018)
 Priyanka Purohit as Bhumi Agarwal – Manjula's niece; Vedika and Rohit's cousin; Sahil's former wife; Ved's foster mother. (2018–2019)
 Abhiroy Singh as Yash Agarwal – Ishwar and Leela's son; Gauri, Prachi and Kshitij's half-brother; Vedika's late husband. (2018)
 Rudrakshi Gupta as Anjana Mehrotra Agarwal – Rishab's wife; Sahil, Jackie and Shruti's mother. (2018)
 Mehul Bhojak as Manish Mehta – Gauri's former husband. (2018)
 Ravish Dumra as Tushar – Puneesh's cousin son; Arya's friend. (2018)
 Priyal Gor as Chameli / Fake Vedika – A woman who pretend as Vedika after her missing. (2018)
 Shaily Pandey / Jazz Sodhi as Nidhi Tripathi – Sunanda's daughter; Mohit's sister; Sahil's childhood friend and former fiancée. (2018)
 Nidhi Vikram as Sunanda Tripathi – Nidhi and Mohit's mother. (2018)
 Varun Tiwari as Mohit Tripathi – Sunanda's son; Nidhi's brother. (2018)
 Shantanu Monga as Rohit Gupta – Manjula's son; Vedika's brother; Kiran's husband. (2018)
 Iti Kaurav as Kiran Gupta – Rohit's wife. (2018)
 Rudra Kaushik as Sunil Mathur – Anurag's brother; Arya's uncle. (2018)
 Mohit Daga as Gautam – Vedika's boss. (2018)

Guests

 Ravi Dubey and Nia Sharma from Jamai Raja (2018)
 Shraddha Arya as Preeta from Kundali Bhagya (2018)
 Neelam Mehra from Kundali Bhagya (2018)

References

External links
Aap Ke Aa Jane Se on ZEE5

Indian television soap operas
2018 Indian television series debuts
Zee TV original programming
Hindi-language television shows
Indian drama television series
Television shows set in Mumbai